Events from the year 1835 in Denmark.

Incumbents
 Monarch – Frederick VI
 Prime minister – Otto Joachim

Events

Undated

Births
 1 May – Marie Rée, newspaper publisher (died 1900)
 9 May – Hans Jørgen Holm, architect (died 1916)
 11 September – Niels Andersen, businessman (died 1911)

Deaths
 9 January – Peter Johansen Neergaard, landowner (born 1769)
 19 February – Constantin Brun, merchant and administrator (born 1746)
 25 March – Friederike Brun, salonist and patron (born 1765)

References

 
1830s in Denmark
Denmark
Years of the 19th century in Denmark